Georgina Jane Burgess (c.1841 – 10 January 1904) was a New Zealand hotel-keeper, midwife and postmistress.

Biography
She was born in Edinburgh, Midlothian, Scotland on c.1841.

She managed the hotel in Burkes Pass from 1861 onward and also served as its postmaster in 1890–94, in addition to being the local midwife. She is a known figure in the local colonial history.

References

1841 births
1904 deaths
New Zealand midwives
Scottish emigrants to New Zealand
New Zealand hoteliers
19th-century New Zealand people